Chromatopoda is a genus of flies in the family Stratiomyidae.

Species
Chromatopoda annulipes (Walker, 1849)

References

Stratiomyidae
Brachycera genera
Taxa named by Friedrich Moritz Brauer
Diptera of Australasia